DuPont de Nemours, Inc., commonly shortened to DuPont, is an American multinational chemical company first formed in 1802 by French-American chemist and industrialist Éleuthère Irénée du Pont de Nemours. The company played a major role in the development of Delaware and first arose as a major supplier of gunpowder. DuPont developed many polymers such as Vespel, neoprene, nylon, Corian, Teflon, Mylar, Kapton, Kevlar, Zemdrain, M5 fiber, Nomex, Tyvek, Sorona, Corfam and Lycra in the 20th century, and its scientists developed many chemicals, most notably Freon (chlorofluorocarbons), for the refrigerant industry. It also developed synthetic pigments and paints including ChromaFlair.

In 2015, DuPont and the Dow Chemical Company agreed to a reorganization plan in which the two companies would merge and split into three. As a merged entity, DuPont simultaneously acquired Dow and renamed itself to DowDuPont on August 31, 2017, and after 18 months spin off the merged entity's material science divisions into a new corporate entity bearing Dow Chemical's name and agribusiness divisions into the newly-created Corteva; DowDuPont reverted its name to DuPont and kept the specialty products divisions. Prior to the spinoffs it was the world's largest chemical company in terms of sales. The merger has been reported to be worth an estimated $130 billion. The present DuPont, as prior to the merger, is headquartered in Wilmington, Delaware, in the state where it is incorporated.

History

1802 to 1902 – First Century of Business 

DuPont was founded in 1802 by Éleuthère Irénée du Pont, using capital raised in France and gunpowder machinery imported from France. He started the company at the Eleutherian Mills, on the Brandywine Creek, near Wilmington, Delaware, two years after du Pont and his family left France to escape the French Revolution and religious persecution against Huguenot Protestants. The company began as a manufacturer of gunpowder, as du Pont noticed that the industry in North America was lagging behind Europe. The company grew quickly, and by the mid-19th century had become the largest supplier of gunpowder to the United States military, supplying one-third to one-half the powder used by the Union Army during the American Civil War. The Eleutherian Mills site is now a museum and a National Historic Landmark.

1902 to 1912 – First major expansion 
DuPont continued to expand, moving into the production of dynamite and smokeless powder. In 1902, DuPont's president, Eugene du Pont, died, and the surviving partners sold the company to three great-grandsons of the original founder. Charles Lee Reese was appointed as director and the company began centralizing their research departments. The company subsequently purchased several smaller chemical companies; in 1912 these actions generated government scrutiny under the Sherman Antitrust Act. The courts declared that the company's dominance of the explosives business constituted a monopoly and ordered divestment. The court ruling resulted in the creation of the Hercules Powder Company (later Hercules Inc. and now part of Ashland Inc.) and the Atlas Powder Company (purchased by Imperial Chemical Industries (ICI) and now part of AkzoNobel). At the time of divestment, DuPont retained the single-base nitrocellulose powders, while Hercules held the double-base powders combining nitrocellulose and nitroglycerine. DuPont subsequently developed the Improved Military Rifle (IMR) line of smokeless powders.

In 1910, DuPont published a brochure entitled "Farming with Dynamite". The pamphlet was instructional, outlining the benefits to using their dynamite products on stumps and various other obstacles that would be easier to remove with dynamite as opposed to other more conventional and inefficient means.

DuPont also established two of the first industrial laboratories in the United States, where they began the work on cellulose chemistry, lacquers and other non-explosive products. DuPont Central Research was established at the DuPont Experimental Station, across the Brandywine Creek from the original powder mills.

1913 to 1919 – Investments into General Motors 
In 1914, Pierre S. du Pont invested in the fledgling automobile industry, buying stock in General Motors (GM). The following year he was invited to be on GM's board of directors and would eventually be appointed the company's chairman. The DuPont company would assist the struggling automobile company further with a $25 million purchase of GM stock ($ in  dollars ). In 1920, Pierre S. du Pont was elected president of General Motors. Under du Pont's leadership, GM became the number one automobile company in the world. However, in 1957, because of DuPont's influence within GM, further action under the Clayton Antitrust Act forced DuPont to divest its shares of General Motors.

1920 to 1940 – Major breakthroughs 

In the 1920s, DuPont continued its emphasis on materials science, hiring Wallace Carothers to work on polymers in 1928. Carothers invented neoprene, a synthetic rubber; the first polyester superpolymer; and, in 1935, nylon. The invention of Teflon followed a few years later and has since been proven responsible for health problems in those exposed to the chemical through manufacturing and home use. DuPont introduced phenothiazine as an insecticide in 1935.

1941 to 1945 – World War II 
DuPont ranked 15th among United States corporations in the value of wartime production contracts. As the inventor and manufacturer of nylon, DuPont helped produce the raw materials for parachutes, powder bags, and tires.

DuPont also played a major role in the Manhattan Project in 1943, designing, building and operating the Hanford plutonium producing plant in Hanford, Washington. In 1950 DuPont also agreed to build the Savannah River Plant in South Carolina as part of the effort to create a hydrogen bomb.

DuPont was one of an estimated 150 American companies that provided Nazi Germany with patents, technology and material resources that proved crucial to the German war effort. DuPont maintained business connections with various corporations in the Third Reich from 1933 until 1943 when all of DuPont's assets in Germany were seized by the Nazi government along with those of all other American companies. Irénée du Pont, a descendant of Éleuthère Irénée du Pont and the president of the company during the buildup to World War II, was also a financial supporter of Nazi führer Adolf Hitler and keenly followed Hitler since the 1920s.

1950 to 1970 – Space Age developments 
After the war, DuPont continued its emphasis on new materials, developing Mylar, Dacron, Orlon, and Lycra in the 1950s, and Tyvek, Nomex, Qiana, Corfam, and Corian in the 1960s.

DuPont has been the key company behind the development of modern body armor. In the Second World War DuPont's ballistic nylon was used by Britain's Royal Air Force to make flak jackets. With the development of Kevlar in the 1960s, DuPont began tests to see if it could resist a lead bullet. This research would ultimately lead to the bullet-resistant vests that are used by police and military units.

1981 to 1999 
In 1981, DuPont acquired Conoco Inc., a major American oil and gas producing company, which gave it a secure source of petroleum feedstocks needed for the manufacturing of many of its fiber and plastics products. The acquisition, which made DuPont one of the top ten U.S.-based petroleum and natural gas producers and refiners, came about after a bidding war with the giant distillery Seagram Company Ltd. Seagram became DuPont's largest single shareholder, with four seats on the board of directors. On April 6, 1995, after being approached by Seagram Chief Executive Officer Edgar Bronfman Jr., DuPont announced a deal in which the company would buy back all the shares owned by Seagram.

In 1999, DuPont spun off Conoco and sold all of its shares.  Conoco later merged with Phillips Petroleum Company.

DuPont acquired the Pioneer Hi-Bred agricultural seed company in 1999.

2000 to 2015 – Further growth, sales, and spinoff of Chemours 

DuPont described itself as a global science company that employs more than 60,000 people worldwide and has a diverse array of product offerings. The company ranks 86th in the Fortune 500 on the strength of nearly $36 billion in revenues, $4.848 billion in profits in 2013. In April 2014, Forbes ranked DuPont 171st on its Global 2000, the listing of the world's top public companies.

DuPont businesses are organized into the following five categories, known as marketing "platforms": Electronic and Communication Technologies, Performance Materials, Coatings and Color Technologies, Safety and Protection, and Agriculture and Nutrition. The agriculture division, DuPont Pioneer, makes and sells hybrid seed and genetically modified seed, some of which produces genetically modified food. Genes engineered into their products include LibertyLink, which provides resistance to Bayer's Ignite Herbicide/Liberty herbicides; the Herculex I Insect Protection gene, which provides protection against various insects; the Herculex RW insect protection trait, which provides protection against other insects; the YieldGard Corn Borer gene, which provides resistance to another set of insects; and the Roundup Ready Corn 2 trait that provides crop resistance against glyphosate herbicides.

In 2010, DuPont Pioneer received approval to start marketing Plenish soybeans, which contain "the highest oleic acid content of any commercial soybean product, at more than 75 percent. Plenish provides a product with no trans fat, 20 percent less saturated fat than regular soybean oil, and more stable oil with greater flexibility in food and industrial applications." Plenish is genetically engineered to "block the formation of enzymes that continue the cascade downstream from oleic acid (that produces saturated fats), resulting in an accumulation of the desirable monounsaturated acid."

In October 2001, the company sold its pharmaceutical business to Bristol Myers Squibb for $7.798 billion.

In 2002, the company sold the Clysar(R) business to Bemis Company for $143 million.

In 2004, the company sold its textiles business, which included some of its best-known brands such as Lycra (Spandex), Dacron polyester, Orlon acrylic, Antron nylon and Thermolite, to Koch Industries.

In 2011, DuPont was the largest producer of titanium dioxide in the world, primarily provided as a white pigment used in the paper industry.

DuPont has 150 research and development facilities located in China, Brazil, India, Germany, and Switzerland, with an average investment of $2 billion annually in a diverse range of technologies for many markets including agriculture, genetic traits, biofuels, automotive, construction, electronics, chemicals, and industrial materials. DuPont employs more than 10,000 scientists and engineers around the world.

On January 9, 2011, DuPont announced that it had reached an agreement to buy Danish company Danisco for US$6.3 billion. On May 16, 2011, DuPont announced that its tender offer for Danisco had been successful and that it would proceed to redeem the remaining shares and delist the company.

On May 1, 2012, DuPont announced that it had acquired from Bunge full ownership of the Solae joint venture, a soy-based ingredients company. DuPont previously owned 72 percent of the joint venture while Bunge owned the remaining 28 percent.

In February 2013, DuPont Performance Coatings was sold to the Carlyle Group and rebranded as Axalta Coating Systems.

In October 2013, DuPont announced that it was planning to spin off its Performance Chemicals business into a new publicly traded company in mid-2015. The company filed its initial Form 10 with the SEC in December 2014 and announced that the new company would be called The Chemours Company. The spin-off to DuPont shareholders was completed on July 1, 2015, and Chemours stock began trading on the New York Stock Exchange on the same date. DuPont will focus on production of GMO seeds, materials for solar panels, and alternatives to fossil fuels. Chemours becomes responsible for the cleanup of 171 former DuPont sites, which DuPont says will cost between $295 million and $945 million.

In October 2015, DuPont sold the Neoprene chloroprene rubber business to Denka Performance Elastomers, a joint venture of Denka and Mitsui.

2015 to present – Reorganization and time as DowDuPont 

On December 11, 2015, DuPont announced a merger with Dow Chemical Company, in an all-stock transaction. The combined company, DowDuPont, had an estimated value of $130 billion, being equally held by both companies’ shareholders, while also maintaining its two headquarters. The merger of the two largest U.S. chemical companies closed on August 31, 2017.

Both companies' boards of directors decided that following the merger, DowDuPont would pursue a separation into three independent, publicly traded companies: an agriculture, a materials science, and a specialty products company. 
 The agriculture business—Corteva Agriscience—unites Dow and DuPont's seed and crop protection unit, with an approximate revenue of $16 billion. 
 The materials science segment— to be named Dow Chemical Company—consists of DuPont's Performance Materials unit, together with Dow's Performance Plastics, Materials and Chemicals, Infrastructure and Consumer Solutions, but excludes Dow's Electronic Materials business. Combined revenue for this branch totals an estimated $51 billion. 
 The specialty products unit—the entity today bearing the DuPont name—includes DuPont's Nutrition & Health, Industrial Biosciences, Safety & Protection and Electronics & Communications, as well as Dow's aforementioned Electronic Materials business. Combined revenue for Specialty Products total approximately $12 billion.

Advisory Committees were established for each of the businesses. DuPont CEO Ed Breen would lead the Agriculture and Specialty Products Committees, and Dow CEO Andrew Liveris would lead the Materials Science Committee. These Committees were intended to oversee their respective businesses, and would work with both CEOs on the scheduled separation of the businesses’ standalone entities. Announced in February 2018, DowDuPont's agriculture division is named Corteva Agriscience, its materials science division is named Dow, and its specialty products division is named DuPont. In March 2018, it was announced that Jeff Fettig would become executive chairman of DowDuPont on July 1, 2018, and Jim Fitterling would become CEO of Dow Chemical on April 1, 2018. In October 2018, the company's agricultural unit recorded a $4.6 billion loss in the third quarter after lowering its long-term sales and profits targets.

In 2019, DuPont completed its spin off from DowDuPont.

In February 2020, DuPont announced that it is bringing back Edward D. Breen as its CEO after removing former Chief Executive Mark Doyle and CFO Jeanmarie Desmond less than a year after they assumed their roles. Lori D. Koch, previously head of investor relations, assumes the CFO position.

In November 2021, DuPont announced that it intended to acquire Rogers Corporation in a deal valued at $5.2 billion. While the deal had been approved by many other regulatory agencies, due to Chinese regulators prolonging the review, DuPont decided on November 1, 2022, to walk away from the deal. DuPont paid Rogers a termination fee of US$162.5 million.

On November 10, 2022, the state of California announced it was filing suit against both DuPont and 3M for their manufacturing of persistent organic pollutants following multi-year probes into both companies. DuPont denies ever manufacturing the chemicals and that the state's claims are meritless.

Operations

Locations 

The company's corporate headquarters and experimental station were located in Wilmington, Delaware. The company's manufacturing, processing, marketing, and research and development facilities, as well as regional purchasing offices and distribution centers were located throughout the world. Major manufacturing sites included the Spruance plant near Richmond, Virginia, (currently the company's largest plant), the Washington Works site in Washington, West Virginia, the Mobile Manufacturing Center (MMC) in Axis, Alabama, the Bayport plant near Houston, Texas, the Mechelen site in Belgium, and the Changshu site in China. Other locations included the Yerkes Plant on the Niagara River at Tonawanda, New York, the Sabine River Works Plant in Orange, Texas, and the Parlin Site in Sayreville, New Jersey. The facilities in Vadodara, Gujarat and Hyderabad, Telangana in India constituted the DuPont Services Center and DuPont Knowledge Center respectively.

Regulation
The European Commission opened a probe to assess whether the proposed merger was in line with the EU's respective regulations. The Commission investigated whether the deal reduced competition in areas such as crop protection, seeds and petrochemicals. The closing date for the merger was repeatedly delayed due to these regulatory inquiries.

Ed Breen said the companies were negotiating possible divestitures in their pesticide operations to win approval for the deal. As part of their EU counterproposal, the companies offered to dispose of a portion of DuPont's crop protection business and associated R&D, as well as Dow's acrylic acid copolymers and ionomers businesses.

The remedy submission in turn delayed the Commission's review deadline to April 4, 2017. The intended spins of the company businesses were expected to occur about 18 months after closing. According to the Financial Times, the merger was "on track for approval in March" 2017. Dow Chemical and DuPont postponed the planned deadline during late March, as they struck an $1.6 billion asset swap with FMC Corporation in order to win the antitrust clearances. DuPont acquired the Corporation's health and nutrition business, while selling its herbicide and insecticide properties.

The European Commission conditionally approved the merger as of April, 2017, although the decision was said to consist of over a thousand pages and was expected to take several months to be released publicly. As part of the approval, Dow must also sell off two acrylic acid co-polymers manufacturing facilities in Spain and the US. China conditionally cleared the merger in May, 2017.

According to former United States Secretary of Agriculture during the Clinton administration, Dan Glickman, and former Governor of Nebraska, Mike Johanns, by creating a single, independent, U.S.-based and - owned pure agriculture company, Dow and DuPont would be able to compete against their still larger global peers. The merger was not opposed by competition authorities around the world due to the view that it did not have noticeable impact on the global seed markets.

On the other hand, if Monsanto and Bayer, the 1st and 3rd largest biotech and seed firms, together with Dow and DuPont being the 4th and 5th largest biotechnology and seed companies in the world respectively, both went through with the mergers, the so-called "Big Six" (including Syngenta and BASF) in the industry would control 63 percent of the global seed market and 76 percent of the global agriculture chemical market. They would also control 95 percent of corn, soybeans, and cotton traits in the US. Both duopolies would become the "big two" industry dominators.

Reception and recognition
DuPont has been awarded the National Medal of Technology four times: first in 1990, for its invention of "high-performance man-made polymers such as nylon, neoprene rubber, "Teflon" fluorocarbon resin, and a wide spectrum of new fibers, films, and engineering plastics"; the second in 2002 "for policy and technology leadership in the phaseout and replacement of chlorofluorocarbons". DuPont scientist George Levitt was honored with the medal in 1993 for the development of sulfonylurea herbicides. In 1996, DuPont scientist Stephanie Kwolek was recognized for the discovery and development of Kevlar. In the 1980s, Dr. Jacob Lahijani, Senior Chemist at DuPont, invented Kevlar 149 and was highlighted in the "Innovation: Agent of Change. Kevlar 149 is used in armor, belts, hoses, composite structures, cable sheathing, gaskets, brake pads, clutch linings, friction pads, slot insulation, phase barrier insulation, and interturn insulation. Following the DuPont and Dow merger and subsequent spinoff, this product line remained with DuPont.

On the company's 200th anniversary in 2002, it was presented with the Honor Award by the National Building Museum in recognition of DuPont's "products that directly influence the construction and design process in the building industry."

Controversies

Environmental record 
DuPont was part of Global Climate Coalition, a group that lobbied against taking action on climate change. DuPont is additionally a company which has been criticized and called out for its activities in Cancer Alley, and while not as vocally criticized as ExxonMobil when it comes to its activities in Cancer Alley, DuPont has been blamed for emitting chloroprene and has been connected by some to anecdotes of "illnesses and ailmen" as told by residents of Cancer Alley.

In 1999, attorney Robert Bilott filed a lawsuit against DuPont, alleging chemical waste (perfluorooctanoic acid) fouled the property of a cattle rancher in Parkersburg, West Virginia. A subsequent lawsuit in 2004 alleged DuPont's actions led to widespread water contamination in West Virginia and Ohio which contributed to high rates of cancers and other health problems. Most of the over 3,000 lawsuits were ultimately settled for over $700 million, and DuPont paid $16.5 million in fines to the Environmental Protection Agency. Bilott's cases were featured in several newspapers and a book, and were adapted in the 2019 film Dark Waters.

In 2005, BusinessWeek magazine, in conjunction with the Climate Group, ranked DuPont as the best-practice leader in cutting their carbon gas emissions. DuPont reduced its greenhouse gas emissions by more than 65 percent from the 1990 levels while using 7 percent less energy and producing 30 percent more product.

In May 2007 the $2.1 million DuPont Nature Center at Mispillion Harbor Reserve, a wildlife observatory and interpretive center on the Delaware Bay near Milford, Delaware was opened to enhance the beauty and integrity of the Delaware Estuary. The facility will be state-owned and operated by the Delaware Department of Natural Resources and Environmental Control (DNREC).

In 2010, researchers at the Political Economy Research Institute of the University of Massachusetts Amherst ranked DuPont as the fourth-largest corporate source of air pollution in the United States. DuPont released a statement that 2012 total releases and transfers were 13% lower than 2011 levels, and 70% lower than 1987 levels. Data from the U.S. Environmental Protection Agency (EPA)'s Toxic Release Inventory database included in the Political Economy Research Institute studies likewise show a reduction in DuPont's emissions from 12.4 million pounds of air releases and 22.4 million pounds of toxic incinerator transfers in 2006 to 10.94 million pounds and 22.0 million pounds, respectively, in 2010. Over the same period, the Political Economy Research Institutes Toxic score for DuPont increased from 122,426 to 7,086,303.

In 2016, Carneys Point Township, New Jersey, where the facility is located, initiated a $1.1 billion lawsuit against the corporation, accusing it of divesting an unprofitable company without first remediating the property as required by law.

In 2012 DuPont was named to the Carbon Disclosure Project Global 500 Leadership Index. Inclusion is based on company performance on sustainability metrics, emissions reduction goals, and environmental performance transparency. In 2014 DuPont was the top scoring company in the chemical sector according to CDP, with a score of "A" or "B" in every evaluation area except for supply chain management.

Between 2007 and 2014 there were thirty-four accidents resulting in toxic releases at DuPont plants across the U.S., with a total of 8 fatalities. As a result, the company became the largest of the 450 businesses placed into the Occupational Safety and Health Administration's "severe violator program" in July 2015. The program was established for companies OSHA says have repeatedly failed to address safety infractions.

Since the 2017 spin-off, the company has adapted its marketing and branding in order to establish a new identity that is "fundamentally different" from DowDuPont. The company published a list of sustainability commitments to be achieved by 2030 in November 2019. DuPont was fined over $3 million for environmental violations in 2018. In 2019, DuPont led the Toxic 100 Water Polluters Index.

Genetically modified foods 

Pioneer Hi-Bred, a DuPont subsidiary until 2019, manufactures genetically modified seeds, other tools, and agricultural technologies used to increase crop yield. In 2019, DowDuPont spun off its agricultural unit, which included Pioneer Hi-Bred, as an independent public company under the name Corteva.

Chlorofluorocarbons 
Dupont, along with Frigidaire and General Motors, was a part of a collaborative effort to find a replacement for toxic refrigerants in the 1920s, resulting in the invention of chlorofluorocarbons (CFCs) by Thomas Midgley in 1928. CFCs are ozone-depleting chemicals that were used primarily in aerosol sprays and refrigerants. DuPont was the largest CFC producer in the world with a 25 percent market share in the 1980s, totaling $600 million in annual sales.

In 1974, responding to public concern about the safety of CFCs, DuPont promised to stop production of CFCs should they be proven to be harmful to the ozone layer. However, after the discovery of grave ozone depletion in 1986, DuPont, as a member of the industry group Alliance for Responsible CFC Policy, lobbied against regulations of CFCs. By 1989, it reversed course after calculating that it would profit from production of other chemicals used to replace CFCs.

In February 1988, United States Senator Max Baucus, along with two other senators, wrote to DuPont reminding the company of its pledge. The Los Angeles Times reported that the letter was "generally regarded as an embarrassment for DuPont, which prides itself on its reputation as an environmentally conscious company." The company responded with a strongly worded letter that the available evidence did not support a need to dramatically reduce CFC production and calling the proposal "unwarranted and counterproductive".

On March 14 of the same year, scientists from the National Aeronautics and Space Agency announced the results of a study demonstrating a 2.3% decline in mid-latitude ozone levels between 1969 and 1986, along with evidence tying the decline to CFCs in the upper atmosphere. On March 24, DuPont reversed its position, calling the NASA results "important new information" and announcing that it would phase out CFC production. The company further called for worldwide controls on CFC production and for additional countries to ratify the Montreal Protocol. DuPont's change of policy was widely praised by environmentalists. In 2003, DuPont was awarded the National Medal of Technology, recognizing the company as the leader in developing CFC replacements.

Perfluorooctanoic acid (PFOA; C8) 
DuPont has faced fines from the EPA and litigation over releases of the Teflon-processing aid perfluoro-octanoic acid (PFOA, also known as C8) from their works in Washington, West Virginia. PFOA-contaminated drinking water led to increased levels of the compound in the bodies of residents who lived in the surrounding area. A court-appointed C8 Science Panel investigated "whether or not there is a probable link between C8 exposure and disease in the community." In 2011, the panel concluded that there is a probable link between PFOA and kidney cancer, testicular cancer, thyroid disease, high cholesterol, pre-eclampsia and ulcerative colitis. Water contamination in the Netherlands and links to cancer are also being investigated.

DuPont agreed to sharply reduce its output of PFOA, and was one of eight companies to sign on with the EPA's 2010/2015 PFOA Stewardship Program. The agreement called for the reduction of "facility emissions and product content of PFOA and related chemicals on a global basis by 95 percent by 2010 and to work toward eliminating emissions and product content of these chemicals by 2015." DuPont phased out PFOA entirely in 2013.

Unlike other persistent organic pollutants, PFOA persists indefinitely and is completely resistant to bio-degradation, remaining toxic. The only way to reduce levels in the body is by physical elimination rather than degradation. In 2014, the International Agency for Research on Cancer designated PFOA as "possibly carcinogenic" in humans. In October 2015, one Ohio resident was awarded $1.6 million when a jury found that her kidney cancer was caused by PFOA in drinking water. In December 2016, $2 million was awarded when a jury found it caused the plaintiff's testicular cancer and awarded punitive damages of $10.5 million. This was the third case where a jury found DuPont liable for injuries resulting from exposure to PFOA in drinking water sources. There were 3,500 similar cases awaiting trial c. 2015. According to the co-lead counselor, internal documents revealed during trial showed DuPont had known of a link between PFOA and cancers since 1997. DuPont maintains it has always handled PFOA "reasonably and responsibly" based on the information they, and industry regulators, had available during its use. However, the jury concluded that DuPont did not act to prevent harm or inform the public, despite the information available. In 2017, DuPont settled 3,550 personal injury claims related to the Parkersburg, West Virginia plant for $671 million.

The litigation was the subject of the 2019 Todd Haynes film Dark Waters starring Mark Ruffalo.

Imprelis 
In October 2010 DuPont began marketing a herbicide called Imprelis, for control of certain plants in turf areas. DuPont voluntarily pulled Imprelis from the market in August 2011 before the EPA issued a mandatory stop-sale order on Imprelis after being alerted of numerous reports from golf courses to nurseries that the product was suspected of injuring and, in some cases, killing trees. Norway spruce, white pines and honey locust proved to be among the species of trees that were susceptible.

Price fixing 
In 2005, the company pleaded guilty to fixing prices of chemicals and products that used neoprene, a synthetic rubber, resulting in an $84 million fine.

See also 

 Dark Waters
 The Devil We Know
 PFAS
 Du Pont family
 DuPont v. Kolon Industries
 Foxcatcher
 Hagley Museum and Library
 Longwood Gardens
 Krebs Pigments and Chemical Company
 Team Foxcatcher

References

Further reading 

 Arora, Ashish; Ralph Landau and Nathan Rosenberg, (eds). (2000). Chemicals and Long-Term Economic Growth: Insights from the Chemical Industry.
 Cerveaux, Augustin. (2013) “Taming the Microworld: DuPont and the Interwar Rise of Fundamental Industrial Research,” Technology and Culture, 54 (April 2013), 262–88.
 Chandler, Alfred D. (1971). Pierre S. Du Pont and the making of the modern corporation.
 Chandler, Alfred D. (1969). Strategy and Structure: Chapters in the History of the American Industrial Enterprise.
 du Pont, B.G. (1920). E.I. du Pont de Nemours and Company: A History 1802–1902. Boston and New York: Houghton Mifflin Company.
 Grams, Martin. The History of the Cavalcade of America: Sponsored by DuPont. (Morris Publishing, 1999). 
 Haynes, Williams (1983). American chemical industry
 Hounshell, David A. and Smith, John Kenly, JR (1988). Science and Corporate Strategy: Du Pont R and D, 1902–1980. Cambridge and New York: Cambridge University Press. .
 Kinnane, Adrian (2002). DuPont: From the Banks of the Brandywine to Miracles of Science. Wilmington: E.I. du Pont de Nemours and Company. .
 Ndiaye, Pap A. (trans. 2007). Nylon and Bombs: DuPont and the March of Modern America
 Zilg, Gerard Colby. DuPont: Behind the Nylon Curtain (Prentice-Hall: 1974) 623 pages, 
 Zilg, Gerard Colby. Du Pont Dynasty: Behind the Nylon Curtain. (Secaucus NJ: Lyle Stuart, 1984). 968 pages,

External links

Corporate History as presented by the company

 
2017 establishments in Delaware
American companies established in 2017
Chemical companies established in 2017
Chemical companies of the United States
Companies based in Wilmington, Delaware
Companies listed on the New York Stock Exchange
Plastics companies of the United States
Textile companies of the United States